Bourbonnella is an extinct genus of ray-finned fish in the family Aeduellidae. It was named by Daniel Heyler in 1969, describing the species B. guilloti. Other species in the genus include B. fourrieri, B. hirsuta, B. jocelynae, and B. sottyi.

References

 
 

Carboniferous bony fish
Prehistoric bony fish genera
Carboniferous fish of North America